The Northern Ireland Football League Championship (known as the Lough 41 Championship for sponsorship reasons) is the second level of the Northern Ireland Football League, the national football league in Northern Ireland. Clubs in the Championship can be promoted to the highest national division - the NIFL Premiership, and relegated to the third level - the NIFL Premier Intermediate League.

It was founded in 2008 as the Premier Intermediate League for members of the previous IFA Intermediate League that met the new stricter membership criteria, though was marketed as the IFA Championship. In 2009, it was extended to two divisions: Championship 1 and Championship 2 with promotion and relegation between the two. In 2013, the Championship and Premiership became part of the Northern Ireland Football League, independent of the Irish Football Association (IFA).

Under reforms agreed by the Irish League clubs in 2014, Championship 1 acquired senior status from the 2016–17 season onwards, continuing as the NIFL Championship. Championship 2 became the NIFL Premier Intermediate League, retaining its intermediate status.

Current NIFL Championship clubs (2021–22)

See also 
IFA Interim Intermediate League
IFA Reserve League
IFA Intermediate Cup
George Wilson Cup
Irish Cup
Irish League Cup
County Antrim Shield
Steel & Sons Cup
Mid-Ulster Cup
Bob Radcliffe Cup
North West Senior Cup
Craig Memorial Cup
Northern Ireland football league system

References

External links
Malcolm Brodie (ed.), Northern Ireland Soccer Yearbook (various editions)

 
2
Northern Ireland
Sports leagues established in 2008
2008 establishments in Northern Ireland